Pasumpon Muthuramalinga Thevar College, Usilampatti is a college that was founded on 5 July 1968 in Madurai District, Tamil Nadu State, India. This college is also known as PMT College.  Initially this college was founded to catered for Usilampatti and nearby area population to get better education.  Later on P.M.T college become world famous and attracted students many parts of the world.this college signed by m.karunanidhi on 17 March 1970.(ref_pmtc.art67).

Pasumpon Muthuramalinga Thevar College, affiliated to Madurai Kamaraj University, was started with the fund of the Kallar community and is administrated by the Kallar Kalvi Kazhagam (Kallar Educastional Foundation). The long-time dream of the people of this area, to hava college, come true by the priceless efforts of this three key leaders thiru P.K. Mookkiah Thevar Ex.M.P., Thiru. V.K.C. Natarajan, IAS, Thiru.K. Perumal Thevar and other well wishers of the community. 

Palani Thevar was the President (2016 - 2017) of The Federation of Indian Communities of Queensland Inc.,(FICQ), a Justice of the Peace, Social Worker in Australia studied in this college from 1984-1987. Palani Thevar is a Labor Candidate for Maiwar 2020, Queensland, Australia.
R.Parthipan - Theni MP (2014), I.Mahendran, ex MLA and also Usilampatti Chairman , Deputy collector S.Arjunan  all went to University here.  Solicitor and Business man Mr O. Uthaysooriyan, Actor and Media expert O. Murugan, ex MLA and also Usilampatti Chairman all went to University here.   Solicitor and Business man Mr O. Uthaysooriyan, Actor and Media expert [http://www.omuru.blogspot.com.au/ O. Murugan (Omuru)  studied here.

Principal Dr.O .Ravi Ph.D.,

External links
 

Colleges in Tamil Nadu
Education in Madurai district
Educational institutions established in 1968
1968 establishments in Madras State